Alfred Brown (19 October 1898 – 1989) was an English professional footballer. A right half or left half, he played for five clubs in a career spanning less than ten years.

Career
As a youth, Brown played for Sheffield Schoolboys and Carbrook Reform. He began his senior career with Sheffield United in his hometown. After failing to make any Football League appearances for the Blades, he transferred to nearby Midland League side Rotherham Town in July 1919. After two seasons with Rotherham, he moved west to join Blackpool in May 1921. He made nine League appearances for the Seasiders in his three seasons with the club.

In 1923, Brown moved back to his native Yorkshire to sign for Barnsley. In two years with the Tykes, Brown made twelve League appearances.

Swindon Town became his next club, in 1926, and it was with Town that he scored his first League goal. It came during fourteen appearances. During the 1927–28 season, Brown went on trial from Swindon to Nelson, for whom he made two appearances. After leaving Swindon, he moved into non-League football in the Manchester area, initially with Hurst. In November 1929, Brown signed for Manchester Central, where he stayed for three years before moving to Stalybridge Celtic in 1932.

References

1898 births
1989 deaths
Footballers from Sheffield
English footballers
Sheffield United F.C. players
Rotherham Town F.C. (1899) players
Blackpool F.C. players
Barnsley F.C. players
Swindon Town F.C. players
Nelson F.C. players
Ashton United F.C. players
Manchester Central F.C. players
Stalybridge Celtic F.C. players
English Football League players
Association football wing halves
People from Ecclesfield
20th-century English people